Morgan Porteus (August 10, 1917 – December 15, 2019) was an Episcopal clergyman in Connecticut who served as the eleventh bishop of that state.

Early life and education
Porteus was born on August 10, 1917, in Hartford, Connecticut. In 1941 he graduated with a B.A. in History and Government from Bates College. Later he studied theology at the Episcopal Theological School from where he graduated with a Bachelor of Sacred Theology in 1943.

Ordination
Porteus was ordained to the diaconate on September 29, 1943, and to the priesthood on June 1, 1944. He served as rector of St Peter's Church in Cheshire, Connecticut from 1944 to 1971.

Bishop
Porteus was elected Suffragan Bishop of Connecticut in 1971 and was consecrated on October 13, 1971, by Presiding Bishop John E. Hines, a consecration which was recorded live by radio and television, something rare for that time. In 1975 he was elected as bishop coadjutor of Connecticut and on September 1, 1977, succeeded as diocesan bishop and was installed on November 19, 1977. He retired in 1981 due to health complications. Porteus died in Wellfleet, Massachusetts in December 2019 at the age of 102.

References

1917 births
2019 deaths
Religious leaders from Hartford, Connecticut
Bates College alumni
Episcopal Divinity School alumni
American centenarians
Men centenarians
Episcopal Church in Connecticut
20th-century American Episcopalians
Episcopal bishops of Connecticut